Stokers Siding is a village located in the Tweed Shire in north-eastern New South Wales, Australia, near the Burringbar Range and Mount Warning. It has been described as an "idyllic village".

Demographics
The median age was 46 years, 8 years above the state and national median. 78.2% of the population were born in Australia; the other top country of birth responses were England 3.5%, New Zealand 2.7%, Germany 1.1% and Papua New Guinea and India both 0.5%. 85.6% of people only spoke English at home; other languages spoken at home included Punjabi 2.3%, Spanish 1.1%, Finnish 0.6% and German and Greek both 0.5%.

History  
The original inhabitants of the area were the Bundjalung people. From 1861 to 1880, the Robertson Land Acts opened up large areas of NSW to farming, and in 1882 Joseph Stoker purchased 600 acres in what was then known as Dunbible Creek. The village developed with the coming of the train line to Murwillumbah and was originally known as Dunbible Siding, although this was eventually changed to Stokers Siding. In 1974, the NSW Government, as part of budget cuts, closed the railway station, with trains going directly to Murwillumbah. In recent years, the village has been home to a thriving arts community.

References 

Suburbs of Tweed Heads, New South Wales
Home of Kayden Smith